Leta Peer (17 April 1964 – 13 February 2012) was a Swiss painter and fine art photographer.

Life
From 1984 to 1987, Peer studied painting at the School of Design in Basel under Franz Fedier. From 1996 to 1997 she lectured as a visiting lecturer at the HISK - Higher Institute for Fine Arts, Antwerp, Belgium.

Exhibitions (selection)
2010: Gratwanderung! (balancing act!), Group exhibition at Neuer Kunstverein in Aachen

Awards
 1986: Press award, annual exhibition of the Bündner Kunstmuseum Chur, Switzerland
 1992: Artist scholarship from Kunstkredit Basel-Stadt, Switzerland
 1993: Scholarship Cité internationale des arts in Paris
 1994: Sponsorship prize from the Canton Graubünden, Switzerland
 1998: Atelier in Brooklyn, New York, through the Foundation Giovannina Bazzi-Mengiardi,
 1999: Artist scholarship from Kunstkredit Basel-Stadt, Switzerland
 1999: Atelier in Montréal, Kanada, through the IAAB Christoph Merian Foundation,
 2000: International Studio Program New York City, USA, catalogue
 2002: Pollock-Krasner Scholarship, New York City, USA

References

External links
Official Leta Peer website

20th-century Swiss painters
21st-century Swiss painters
Swiss photographers
Swiss women painters
Swiss women photographers
1964 births
2012 deaths
Swiss contemporary artists
Fine art photographers